Ambrose S. Lapham House is a historic home located at Palmyra, Wayne County, New York.  It was built about 1869, and is a large -story, Italianate style brick dwelling.  It has a low hipped roof with overhanging eaves and decorative brackets topped by a cupola.  Also on the property are the contributing late-19th century wood-framed barn with its historic cupola, doors and horse stalls; a rustic late-19th century gazebo; and four extant historic brick piers along the property line.

It was listed on the National Register of Historic Places in 2014.

References

External links

Houses on the National Register of Historic Places in New York (state)
Italianate architecture in New York (state)
Houses completed in 1869
Houses in Wayne County, New York
National Register of Historic Places in Wayne County, New York